Safari Drums is a 1953 American adventure film and starring Johnny Sheffield as Bomba. It was the ninth in the 12-film Bomba, the Jungle Boy series.

Plot
A millionaire brings a tiger and film crew to Africa in hopes of staging a battle between the tiger and a lion. Commissioner Barnes learns that one of the crew is a murderer and asks Bomba to find out which one. The Lost Volcano erupts again (this film makes use of previously seen footage) and there is a battle between a lion and a tiger.

Cast
 Johnny Sheffield as Bomba
 Douglas Kennedy Brad Morton
 Barbara Bestar as Peggy Jethro
 Emory Parnell as Larry Conrad
 Paul Marion as Steve
 Leonard Mudie as Deputy Commissioner Barnes
 Smoki Whitfield as Eli 
 Russ Conway as Collins

Reception
The Los Angeles Times called this "one of the most exciting jungle pictures you have ever seen."

References

External links

1953 films
American adventure films
Films directed by Ford Beebe
1953 adventure films
Allied Artists films
American black-and-white films
1950s English-language films
1950s American films